The 2017 North Miami mayoral election took place on May 9, 2017, to elect the mayor of North Miami, Florida. The election was officially nonpartisan. Smith Joseph was elected with a majority of the vote and thus avoided a runoff.

Candidates
Smith Joseph - Incumbent Mayor since 2014. (Democratic Party)
Hector Medina - Retired medical doctor (Democratic Party)
Danielle C.J. Beauvais - Alternative medical consultant
Tyrone Hill - Middle school teacher, former member of the North Miami Chamber of Commerce

Results

References

2017
2017 United States mayoral elections
2017 Florida elections
May 2017 events in the United States